is a public foundation in Kōbe, Hyōgo, Japan. Founded in 1963, the organization operates land development, construction, parking lot, public facilities, sightseeing related business, and sewer of the city.

Transportations
As a part of its sightseeing business, the foundation operates three aerial lifts and a funicular line at Mount Rokkō and Mount Maya.
Rokkō Arima Ropeway
It was a longest aerial tramway system in Japan, until Omote-Rokkō Line went out of service in 2004.
Shin-Kōbe Ropeway (Kōbe Yume-Fūsen)
Maya View Line Yume-Sanpo
Maya Cable: A funicular line handed over from Rokkō Maya Railway.
Maya Ropeway: Transferred from Kōbe Municipal Transportation Bureau.

External links
 Official website

Railway companies of Japan
Kobe